Norbert Gstrein (born 1961) is an Austrian writer. He was born in Mils in Tyrol, the son of the hotelier and ski school director Norbert Gstrein (1931–1988) and Maria Gstrein, née Thurner (born 1935). From 1979 to 1984, Gstrein studied mathematics in Innsbruck, Stanford and Erlangen. He not completed his PhD (no defense of his thesis Zur Logik der Fragen) in 1988 at the University of Innsbruck, under the supervision of Roman Liedl and Gerhard Frey.

Gstrein is the author of more than a dozen books, including Winters in the South, translated into English by Anthea Bell and Julian Evans, and A Sense of the Beginning, translated by Julian Evans. Gstrein's novels have been translated into more than a dozen languages. His early books were all based in his native Tyrol. Among his numerous awards are the Alfred Döblin Prize and the Uwe Johnson Prize.

Gstrein lives as a freelance writer in Hamburg.

Awards
 1989 Rauris Literature Prize
 1999 Alfred Döblin Prize
 2001 Literaturpreis der Konrad-Adenauer-Stiftung
 2003 Uwe Johnson Prize
 2004 Franz Nabl Prize
 2013 Anton Wildgans Prize
 2021 Thomas Mann Prize

Works

English translations

French translations

Spanish translations

Polish translations

Dutch translations

References

Further reading

External links

Austrian male writers
1961 births
Living people